Georgette Sobhi Kaliny is an Egyptian politician who served as a member of the Pan-African Parliament representing Egypt and as a member of the Parliament of Egypt.

References

Living people
Year of birth missing (living people)
21st-century Egyptian politicians
Members of the Pan-African Parliament from Egypt